Julian Andre Cyr is an American politician, who was elected to the Massachusetts State Senate in 2016. A Democrat, he represents the Cape and Islands district. In 2017, Cyr completed John F. Kennedy School of Government program for senior executives in state and local government as a David Bohnett LGBTQ Victory Institute Leadership Fellow.

A native of Truro, Massachusetts, prior to his election to the senate he worked on policy and regulatory affairs for the Massachusetts Department of Public Health and served as chair of the Massachusetts Commission on LGBT Youth.

Election
Cyr won the primary on September 8 against Sheila Lyons. The primary was widely considered competitive, and many lawn signs were seen on Route 6 and throughout Cape Cod. Cyr won the primary 55% to 38%.

Cyr won the general election on November 8, defeating Republican Tony Schiavi, winning 57% to 43%.

See also
 2019–2020 Massachusetts legislature
 2021–2022 Massachusetts legislature

References

External links 
 

Democratic Party Massachusetts state senators
Living people
LGBT state legislators in Massachusetts
Gay politicians
People from Truro, Massachusetts
People from Hyannis, Massachusetts
1986 births
21st-century American politicians